Čedem (in older sources also Čedno) is a small settlement in the eastern Gorjanci Hills in the Municipality of Brežice in eastern Slovenia, right on the border with Croatia.  The area is part of the traditional region of Lower Carniola. During the Second World War it was one of five Slovene settlements annexed by the Independent State of Croatia. It is now included with the rest of the municipality in the Lower Sava Statistical Region.

The village is protected as a national heritage monument by the Slovenian Ministry of Culture. Single-storey rectangular wooden houses with a variety of outbuildings such as sties, hayracks, and granaries all date to the late 19th and early 20th centuries. The exteriors of the houses are painted blue, ochre, or brown.

References

External links
Čedem on Geopedia

Populated places in the Municipality of Brežice